José Leite (born 11 February 1938) is a Brazilian boxer. He competed in the men's light heavyweight event at the 1960 Summer Olympics. At the 1960 Summer Olympics, he lost to Rafael Gargiulo of Argentina.

References

1938 births
Living people
Brazilian male boxers
Olympic boxers of Brazil
Boxers at the 1960 Summer Olympics
Sportspeople from Minas Gerais
Light-heavyweight boxers
20th-century Brazilian people